Joseph Farrell may refer to:

 Joseph Farrell (politician) (1905–1999), Irish Fianna Fáil politician
 Joseph Farrell (priest) (1873–1960), Irish-American Roman Catholic priest

See also
Joe Farrell (disambiguation)